Saturation point may refer to:

 Dew point, in meteorology
 Hydrocarbon dew point
 Saturation Point (album)